Longvek or Lavek (or , ; meaning "intersection" or "crossroads") was a city in Cambodia. It was the second capital city during the Cambodia's Post-Angkor period which began after the Angkor era.  The city was known to early European traders as "Cambodia". The city used to serve as a center of the country's military.  It was a gathering point for people of knowledge including scholars and martial artists.

Longvek was chosen by King Ang Chan I after the sacking of Angkor by the Siamese as a new capital because of its more readily defensible terrain. As a result, there was a time when Cambodia was often referred to as Longvek by foreign travellers. It was considered one of the greatest cities in Cambodia. After Ang Chan I defeated Sdach Korn he moved the capital city from Chaktomuk to Longvek in 1528. This new city was the capital of the Kingdom of Cambodia from 1528 to 1594. King Ang Chan I ordered his palace to be built in Longvek in 1553.

History
During the 14th and 15th centuries, Cambodia was in a state of eclipse. Following the almost total destruction of Angkor, Longvek was chosen as the new capital of the now minor state of Cambodia. Longvek was located halfway between Phnom Penh and the southern end of the Tonlé Sap and it was chosen by King Outey Reachea III (1516–1566) as his official capital. 

Longvek became the nation's capital in the 16th century after the civil war between King Ang Chan I and Sdach Korn. After Ang Chan's I victory, he became the new king of Cambodia.

Spanish and Portuguese adventurers and missionaries, like Blas Ruiz de Hernán González from Ciudad Real, first visited the kingdom during this period. Blas became a friend of King Satha of Longvek, who was well-disposed towards foreigners, and while in the kingdom got to know Portuguese adventurer Diogo Beloso from Amarante. The Iberians referred to Phnom Penh as "Churdumuco" and to Srei Santhor as "Sistor". Not long thereafter Longvek was invaded by the Siamese ruler of Ayutthaya.

King Naresuan of Siam conquered Longvek in 1593. This conquest marked a downturn in the kingdom's fortunes. In the historical period that followed Cambodia became a pawn in a power struggle between its two increasingly powerful neighbours, Siam and Vietnam.

In 1618, the capital of Cambodia was once again relocated and was moved to Oudong.

Notes

References

Bibliography
Ben Kiernan, Blood and soil   
Sanjay Subrahmanyam & Marie-José Capelle,  L'Empire portugais d'Asie, 1500–1700; Histoire politique et économique. Maisonneuve & Larose (1999)

External links
Cambodia in the Writings of Diego Aduarte and Gabriel Quiroga de San Antonio
Le voyage en Indochine de F.Garnier en 1866-68 - part 2

Former populated places in Cambodia